Saint-Bazile-de-la-Roche (Limousin: Sent Bausilha de la Ròcha) is a former commune in the Corrèze department in central France. On 1 January 2017, it was merged into the new commune Argentat-sur-Dordogne.

Population

See also
Communes of the Corrèze department

References

Former communes of Corrèze
Populated places disestablished in 2017